The SNCF Class BB 1600 were a class of 1,500 V DC electric locomotives built for the Pau – Lourdes line of the Chemins de fer du Midi by CEF (Constructions électriques de France). Numbered E 4001 to E 4050 at Midi, they became BB 4500 – B4550 when SNCF was created, then were relegated to  shunting duties under the numbers BB 1601 to BB 1650 in the 1950s.

Bibliography 

1600
Bo′Bo′ locomotives
Standard gauge electric locomotives of France
1500 V DC locomotives
Railway locomotives introduced in 1922